Stožina is a peak in the Durmitor mountain range in northern Montenegro. At , it is not among the highest peaks in the range, but due to its iconic shape and location, it has become a well-known symbol of the area and the Durmitor National Park.

References 

Mountains of Montenegro